The 2011 WNBA season is the 6th season for the Chicago Sky of the Women's National Basketball Association. Sky center Sylvia Fowles finished the season as only the second player in WNBA history to average at least 20 points and 10 rebounds per game. Pokey Chatman was named the Head Coach and General Manager, after Steven Key resigned following the 2010 season.

Transactions

WNBA Draft

Trades and Roster Changes

Roster
{| class="toccolours" style="font-size: 95%; width: 100%;"
|-
! colspan="2"  style="background:#4b90cc; color:#Fbb726"|2011 Chicago Sky Roster
|- style="text-align:center; background-color:#Fbb726; color:#FFFFFF;"
! Players !! Coaches
|- 
| valign="top" |
{| class="sortable" style="background:transparent; margin:0px; width:100%;"
! Pos. !! # !! Nat. !! Name !! Ht. !! Wt. !! From
|-

Depth

Schedule

Preseason

|- align="center" bgcolor="bbffbb"
| 1 || May 23 || 11:30am || China || 84-45 || Sylvia Fowles (18) || Carolyn Swords (8) || Courtney Vandersloot (7) || Trinity International University  972 || 1-0
|- align="center" bgcolor="ffbbbb"
| 2 || May 26 || 11:30am || @ Washington || 55-66 || Epiphanny Prince (12) || Sylvia Fowles (6) || Epiphanny Prince (4) || Verizon Center  9,502 || 1-1
|-

Regular Season

|- align="center" bgcolor="ffbbbb"
| 1 || June 4 || 7:00pm || @ Indiana || CN100FS-I || 57-65 || Epiphanny Prince (20) || FowlesKraayeveldSnow (7) || Courtney Vandersloot (7) || Conseco Fieldhouse  8,024 || 0-1
|- align="center" bgcolor="bbffbb"
| 2 || June 10 || 8:30pm || Connecticut || CN100 || 78-75 || Sylvia Fowles (23) || Sylvia Fowles (13) || Epiphanny Prince (7) || Allstate Arena  6,609 || 1-1
|- align="center" bgcolor="bbffbb"
| 3 || June 11 || 7:00pm || @ Washington || CN100 || 84-77 || Sylvia Fowles (23) || Michelle Snow (8) || Dominique Canty (6) || Verizon Center  11,943 || 2-1
|- align="center" bgcolor="bbffbb"
| 4 || June 17 || 8:30pm || New York || CN100 || 85-73 || Sylvia Fowles (27) || Sylvia Fowles (11) || Epiphanny Prince (8) || Allstate Arena  5,718 || 3-1
|- align="center" bgcolor="ffbbbb"
| 5 || June 19 || 1:00pm || @ Connecticut ||  || 68-83 || Sylvia Fowles (23) || Sylvia Fowles (12) || Courtney Vandersloot (6) || Mohegan Sun Arena  6,875 || 3-2 
|- align="center" bgcolor="ffbbbb"
| 6 || June 21 || 12:00pm || @ Atlanta || SSO || 68-71 || Sylvia Fowles (21) || Michelle Snow (12) || Courtney Vandersloot (6) || Philips Arena  6,154 || 3-3 
|- align="center" bgcolor="bbffbb"
| 7 || June 23 || 8:00pm || Connecticut || CN100 || 107-101 (2OT) || Epiphanny Prince (25) || Michelle Snow (17) || Courtney Vandersloot (10) || Allstate Arena  3,319 || 4-3 
|- align="center" bgcolor="ffbbbb"
| 8 || June 25 || 8:00pm || Phoenix || CN100 || 78-86 || Sylvia Fowles (28) || Sylvia Fowles (11) || Courtney Vandersloot (4) || Allstate Arena  5,547 || 4-4 
|- align="center" bgcolor="ffbbbb"
| 9 || June 28 || 8:00pm || San Antonio || CN100 || 74-84 || Epiphanny Prince (19) || Sylvia Fowles (12) || PrinceThorn (4) || Allstate Arena  3,894 || 4-5
|-

|- align="center" bgcolor="ffbbbb"
| 10 || July 1 || 10:00pm || @ Phoenix || NBATVCN100 || 84-97 || Epiphanny Prince (19) || Lindsay Wisdom-Hylton (8) || Epiphanny Prince (6) || US Airways Center  9,517 || 4-6 
|- align="center" bgcolor="bbffbb"
| 11 || July 5 || 8:00pm || Washington || CN100 || 78-65 || Sylvia Fowles (34) || Sylvia Fowles (16) || Erin Thorn (4) || Allstate Arena  3,187 || 5-6 
|- align="center" bgcolor="bbffbb"
| 12 || July 9 || 8:00pm || Atlanta || CN100 || 81-69 || Epiphanny Prince (24) || Sylvia Fowles (12) || Courtney Vandersloot (9) || Allstate Arena  5,679 || 6-6 
|- align="center" bgcolor="ffbbbb"
| 13 || July 10 || 4:00pm || @ New York || NBATVCN100MSG+ || 73-80 || FowlesVandersloot (14) || Sylvia Fowles (8) || Tamera Young (4) || Prudential Center  7,315 || 6-7 
|- align="center" bgcolor="bbffbb"
| 14 || July 13 || 12:30pm || Tulsa ||  || 74-52 || Sylvia Fowles (21) || Sylvia Fowles (13) || Epiphanny Prince (6) || Allstate Arena  13,838 || 7-7 
|- align="center" bgcolor="ffbbbb"
| 15 || July 16 || 7:30pm || @ Atlanta || NBATVCN100FS-S || 68-76 || Sylvia Fowles (20) || Michelle Snow (12) || Erin Thorn (9) || Philips Arena  7,413 || 7-8 
|- align="center" bgcolor="bbffbb"
| 16 || July 19 || 7:00pm || Seattle || ESPN2 || 78-69 || Sylvia Fowles (24) || Sylvia Fowles (9) || Courtney Vandersloot (7) || Allstate Arena  6,026 || 8-8 
|- align="center" bgcolor="ffbbbb"
| 17 || July 21 || 7:00pm || @ Indiana || NBATVCN100FS-I || 63-77 || Sylvia Fowles (21) || Michelle Snow (6) || Erin Thorn (5) || Conseco Fieldhouse  8,050 || 8-9 
|-
| colspan="11" align="center" valign="middle" | All-Star break
|- align="center" bgcolor="ffbbbb"
| 18 || July 26 || 8:00pm || Connecticut || CN100CSN-NE || 66-77 || Epiphanny Prince (16) || Sylvia Fowles (12) || Tamera Young (5) || Allstate Arena  3,091 || 8-10 
|- align="center" bgcolor="bbffbb"
| 19 || July 28 || 8:00pm || @ Tulsa ||  || 64-55 || Sylvia Fowles (14) || Michelle Snow (11) || Michelle Snow (5) || BOK Center  4,012 || 9-10 
|- align="center" bgcolor="ffbbbb"
| 20 || July 30 || 8:00pm || Los Angeles || CN100 || 84-88 || Erin Thorn (17) || Sylvia Fowles (9) || Epiphanny Prince (5) || Allstate Arena  5,909 || 9-11 
|-

|- align="center" bgcolor="ffbbbb"
| 21 || August 4 || 12:00pm || @ New York || NBATVMSG || 49-59 || Sylvia Fowles (11) || Sylvia Fowles (8) || Epiphanny Prince (3) || Prudential Center  10,133 || 9-12 
|- align="center" bgcolor="bbffbb"
| 22 || August 7 || 6:00pm || Indiana || CN100 || 88-69 || FowlesMurphy (21) || Sylvia Fowles (12) || Erin Thorn (4) || Allstate Arena  5,794 || 10-12 
|- align="center" bgcolor="ffbbbb"
| 23 || August 9 || 7:30pm || @ Connecticut ||  || 58-69 || Sylvia Fowles (19) || Tamera Young (15) || Courtney Vandersloot (3) || Mohegan Sun Arena  6,049 || 10-13
|- align="center" bgcolor="ffbbbb"
| 24 || August 12 || 8:30pm || Minnesota || CN100 || 76-79 || Sylvia Fowles (28) || Sylvia Fowles (13) || Courtney Vandersloot (8) || Allstate Arena  6,289 || 10-14 
|- align="center" bgcolor="bbffbb"
| 25 || August 14 || 3:00pm || @ San Antonio || NBATVCN100 || 85-73 || Sylvia Fowles (28) || Sylvia Fowles (17) || Dominique Canty (6) || AT&T Center  7,060 || 11-14 
|- align="center" bgcolor="bbffbb"
| 26 || August 20 || 7:00pm || @ Washington || NBATVCN100 || 71-70 || Sylvia Fowles (25) || Sylvia Fowles (11) || PrinceYoung (4) || Verizon Center  10,273 || 12-14 
|- align="center" bgcolor="ffbbbb"
| 27 || August 23 || 8:00pm || Atlanta || CN100 || 80-83 || Sylvia Fowles (20) || Sylvia Fowles (12) || Michelle Snow (3) || Allstate Arena  2,876 || 12-15 
|- align="center" bgcolor="bbffbb"
| 28 || August 26 || 8:30pm || Washington || CN100 || 80-67 || Epiphanny Prince (18) || Sylvia Fowles (12) || ThornVandersloot (5) || Allstate Arena  4,434 || 13-15 
|- align="center" bgcolor="bbffbb"
| 29 || August 28 || 6:00pm || New York || NBATVCN100 || 74-73 || FowlesThorn (17) || Sylvia Fowles (14) || ThornYoung (4) || Allstate Arena  5,707 || 14-15 
|- align="center" bgcolor="ffbbbb"
| 30 || August 30 || 7:00pm || @ New York || CN100MSG+ || 67-71 || Sylvia Fowles (22) || Sylvia Fowles (8) || Erin Thorn (4) || Prudential Center  6,334 || 14-16 
|-

|- align="center" bgcolor="ffbbbb"
| 31 || September 4 || 6:00pm || Indiana || NBATVCN100 || 80-88 || Epiphanny Prince (21) || Sylvia Fowles (9) || Epiphanny Prince (6) || Allstate Arena  6,199 || 14-17 
|- align="center" bgcolor="ffbbbb"
| 32 || September 8 || 8:00pm || @ Minnesota || NBATVCN100FS-N || 69-78 || FowlesThorn (17) || Carolyn Swords (8) || SwordsVandersloot (4) || Target Center  8,781 || 14-18 
|- align="center" bgcolor="ffbbbb"
| 33 || September 10 || 10:30pm || @ Los Angeles || NBATVCN100 || 67-74 || Sylvia Fowles (18) || Sylvia Fowles (11) || Dominique Canty (6) || STAPLES Center  13,501 || 14-19 
|- align="center" bgcolor="ffbbbb"
| 34 || September 11 || 9:00pm || @ Seattle || NBATVKONG || 70-81 || Sylvia Fowles (30) || Sylvia Fowles (13) || Erin Thorn (7) || KeyArena  13,659 || 14-20
|-

| All games are viewable on WNBA LiveAccess or ESPN3.com

Standings

Statistics

Regular Season

Awards and Honors

References

External links

Chicago Sky seasons
Chicago
Chicago Sky